Michael George Conroy (born 31 July 1957) is a Scottish former professional footballer who played as a midfielder. He played in the Scottish Premier Division with Celtic (winning three league championships and a Scottish Cup) and Hibernian, before playing for several clubs in the Football League.

He finished his career in Ireland with Cork City, who were managed by Eamonn O'Keefe. Conroy lives in Cork City.

His father, also named Michael, was also a footballer who played for Celtic on the a part-time basis in the 1950s and later worked as a scout for the club.

References

External links

1957 births
Living people
People from Johnstone
Scottish footballers
Scottish Football League players
Association football midfielders
Celtic F.C. players
Hibernian F.C. players
Blackpool F.C. players
Wrexham A.F.C. players
Leyton Orient F.C. players
Cork City F.C. players
English Football League players
Footballers from Renfrewshire
Scottish people of Irish descent
Port Glasgow F.C. players
Scottish Junior Football Association players